Alawatugama is a village in Sri Lanka. It is located within Nuwara Eliya District, Central Province, and is a hamlet of Damunumeya.

History
The inhabitants of the village were "Paduwo, Smiths, [and] Durayo", according to Archibald Campbell Lawrie's 1896 gazetteer of the province, referring to the caste system.

The Berammane Bogaha Maluwa vihāra located in the village is in ruins.

Demographics

See also
List of towns in Central Province, Sri Lanka

References

External links

Populated places in Nuwara Eliya District